The 1966 FA Cup final was a football match played on 14 May 1966. It was contested by Everton and Sheffield Wednesday at Wembley. Everton were the first team since Bury in 1903 to reach an FA Cup Final without conceding a goal, while Sheffield Wednesday reached the final having played every round away.

Everton came back from 2–0 down to win 3–2 with goals by Mike Trebilcock (2) and Derek Temple. Jim McCalliog and David Ford scored the Owls' goals. Temple's winner came after an unfortunate slip by Gerry Young, when the ball squirmed under his foot, and Temple was able to run clear and slot the ball past goalkeeper Ron Springett into the corner. Everton became only the second side, after Blackpool in 1953, to come from two goals behind to win the cup without needing extra time, a feat which has not been repeated since.

John Lennon and Paul McCartney of The Beatles attended the match. Everton fan Eddie Cavanagh invaded the playing area and was pursued across the pitch by a policeman.

This result meant the FA Cup was taken back to Goodison Park for the third time and the first time for 33 years, since the team that included Dixie Dean won it in 1933.

Route to the final

Match details

References

External links
Match report from www.evertonfc.com

1966
Final
FA Cup Final
Fa Cup Final 1966
Fa Cup Final 1966
FA Cup Final